The 2012 Latvian Individual Speedway Championship was the 38th Latvian Individual Speedway Championship season. The final took place on 8 July 2012 in Daugavpils, Latvia.

Results
 July 8, 2012
  Daugavpils

Speedway in Latvia
2012 in Latvian sport
2012 in speedway